The kana preface to the Kokin Wakashū (古今和歌集仮名序 Kokin Wakashū kana-jo, 古今集仮名序 Kokinshū kana-jo, or simply 仮名序 kana-jo; rekishi-teki kanazukai: 假名序) is one of the two prefaces to the tenth-century Japanese waka anthology, the Kokin Wakashū. It was written by the poet/editor Ki no Tsurayuki. It is also known in English as the Japanese preface, distinguishing it from Ki no Yoshimochi's Chinese preface (mana-jo). It was the first serious work of poetic criticism on the waka style, and is regarded as the predecessor of later karon works.

Authorship, date and context 
The kana preface, or Japanese preface, is one of the two prefaces that were given to the Kokin Wakashū, a tenth-century anthology of Japanese waka poetry. It was written by Ki no Tsurayuki, the principal compiler of the anthology.

The other is Ki no Yoshimochi's Chinese preface (mana-jo).

The kana preface was written between the second month of Engi 6 (906) and the first month of the following year.

Contents 
The kana preface to opens with a detailed and poetic explication of what the core concept of waka poetry is.

It divides the waka into six stylistic categories, explaining each of those categories and giving an example. These categories were derived from the Grand Preface to the Shi Jing, and their application to Japanese poetry has been criticized as "halfhearted" and "meaningless".

It then goes on to discussing the ideal waka and listing two poets (probably Kakinomoto no Hitomaro and Yamabe no Akahito) as the ideal poets, and listing six great poets (the Rokkasen) of what was then the recent past. Finally, it touches on the compilation process for the Kokin Wakashū and speculates on the future of the waka.

Reception 
The opening lines of kana preface have been regarded as the archetypal work of Japanese classical prose. Its status in the poetic tradition made Tsurayuki the arbiter of Japanese poetic criticism until the Meiji period.

Donald Keene, in his Seeds in the Heart: Japanese Literature from Earliest Times to the Late Sixteenth Century, called it "one of the earliest and best-known documents of Japanese poetic criticism". Haruo Shirane called the famous opening lines of the preface "line for line, [...] undoubtedly the most heavily commented secular prose text of the Japanese tradition".

References

Works cited 

 
 
 
 
 

Kokin Wakashū
Ki no Tsurayuki
Karon (waka)